Xylosma inaequinervia is a species of flowering plant in the family Salicaceae. It is endemic to New Caledonia.

References

inaequinervia
Endemic flora of New Caledonia
Endangered plants
Taxonomy articles created by Polbot
Taxa named by Hermann Otto Sleumer